Radio On is a 1979 film directed by Christopher Petit. It is a rare example of a British road movie, shot in black and white by Wim Wenders' assistant cameraman Martin Schäfer and featuring music from a number of new wave bands of the time, as well as established artists such as Kraftwerk, Devo and David Bowie. It is a journey through late 1970s Britain by way of a road trip from London to Bristol, with Robert, a DJ (played by David Beames) attempting to investigate the suicide of his brother. The radio station where Robert is a disc jockey was based on the United Biscuits Network, which broadcast to factories owned by United Biscuits.

In his 2022 book Roadrunner Nick Gilbert revisits the film, the route and its resonances 43 years later and includes contributions from Petit and others involved in the film.

Cast
David Beames as Robert
Andrew Byatt as Deserter
Paul Hollywood as Kid
Adrian Jones		
Sue Jones-Davies as Girl
Cyril Kent		
Katja Kersten		
Lisa Kreuzer as Ingrid
Sabina Michael as Aunt
Bernard Mistovski		
Nina Pace		
Sandy Ratcliff as Kathy
Joseph Riordan		
David Squire		
Sting as Just Like Eddie
Kim Taylforth

References

External links

Radio On at Time Out London

1979 films
1979 drama films
1970s mystery drama films
1970s drama road movies
British drama road movies
British mystery drama films
West German films
English-language German films
British black-and-white films
Films set in London
Films set in Bristol
Films directed by Chris Petit
1970s English-language films
1970s British films